Kate Georgina Elizabeth Oakenfold (born 23 July 1984) is an English former cricketer who played as a right-handed batter and right-arm fast-medium bowler. She appeared in three One Day Internationals for England in August 2001, making her debut against Scotland. She played county cricket for Sussex and had spells with Australian state sides Western Australia and South Australia.

References

External links
 
 

1984 births
Living people
Sportspeople from Brighton
England women One Day International cricketers
South Australian Scorpions cricketers
Sussex women cricketers
Western Australia women cricketers